The groundhog (Marmota monax), also known as a woodchuck, is a rodent of the family Sciuridae, belonging to the group of large ground squirrels known as marmots. 
The groundhog is a lowland creature of North America; it is found through much of the Eastern United States, across Canada and into Alaska. 
It was first scientifically described by Carl Linnaeus in 1758.

The groundhog is also referred to as a chuck, wood-shock, groundpig, whistlepig, whistler, thickwood badger, Canada marmot, monax, moonack, weenusk, red monk, land beaver, and, among French Canadians in eastern Canada, siffleux. The name "thickwood badger" was given in the Northwest to distinguish the animal from the prairie badger. Monax (Móonack) is an Algonquian name of the woodchuck, which means "digger" (cf. Lenape monachgeu). Young groundhogs may be called chucklings.

The groundhog, being a lowland animal, is exceptional among marmots. Other marmots, such as the yellow-bellied and hoary marmots, live in rocky and mountainous areas. Groundhogs play an important role maintaining healthy soil in woodlands and plains. The groundhog is considered a crucial habitat engineer. Groundhogs are considered the most solitary of the marmot species. They live in aggregations, and their social organization also varies across populations. Groundhogs do not form stable, long-term pair-bonds, and during mating season male-female interactions are limited to copulation. In Ohio, adult males and females associate with each other throughout the year and often from year to year. Groundhogs are an extremely intelligent animal forming complex social networks, able to understand social behavior, form kinship with their young, understand and communicate threats through whistling, and work cooperatively to solve tasks such as burrowing.

Description

The groundhog is by far the largest sciurid in its geographical range, excepting British Columbia where its range may  that of its somewhat larger cousin, the hoary marmot.

Male groundhogs average slightly larger than females and, like all marmots, they are considerably heavier during autumn (when engaged in autumn hyperphagia) than when emerging from hibernation in spring. Seasonal weight changes indicate circannual deposition and use of fat. Groundhogs attain progressively higher weights each year for the first two or three years, after which weight plateaus.

Constant usage wears them down again by about that much each week. Unlike the incisors of many other rodents, the incisors of groundhogs are white to ivory-white. Groundhogs are well-adapted for digging, with powerful, short legs and broad, long claws. The groundhog's tail is shorter than that of other sciurids—only about one-fourth of body length.

Etymology
The etymology of the name woodchuck is unrelated to wood or chucking. It stems from an Algonquian (possibly Narragansett) name for the animal, wuchak. The similarity between the words has led to the popular tongue-twister:

How much wood would a woodchuck chuck
if a woodchuck could chuck wood?
A woodchuck would chuck all the wood he could
if a woodchuck could chuck wood!

Distribution and habitat
The groundhog prefers open country and the edges of woodland, and is rarely far from a burrow entrance. Marmota monax has a wide geographic range. It can typically be found in small woodlots, low-elevation forests, fields and pastures, and hedgerows. It constructs dens in well-drained soil, and most have summer and winter dens. Human activity has increased food access and abundance, allowing M. monax to thrive.

Survival

In the wild, groundhogs can live up to six years with two or three being average. In captivity, groundhogs reportedly live up to 14 years. Human development, which often produces openings juxtaposed with second growth trees that are incidentally also favored by groundhogs, often ensures that groundhogs in well-developed areas are nearly free of predators, beyond humans (through various forms of pest control or roadkills) or mid-to-large sized dogs.

Wild predators of adult groundhogs in most of eastern North America include coyotes, badgers, bobcats, and foxes (largely only red fox). Many of these predators are successful stealth stalkers so can catch groundhogs by surprise before the large rodents can escape to their burrows; badgers likely hunt them by digging them out from their burrows. Coyotes in particular are sizable enough to overpower any groundhog, with the latter being the third most significant prey species per a statewide study in Pennsylvania.

Large predators such as gray wolf and eastern cougar are basically extirpated in the east but still may hunt groundhogs on occasion in Canada. Golden eagles can also prey on adult groundhogs, but seldom occur in the same range or in the same habitats as this marmot. Likewise, great horned owls can reportedly, per Bent (1938), prey upon groundhogs, but this owl rarely does so, especially given the temporal differences in their behaviors.

Young groundhogs (usually those less than a couple months in age) may also be taken by an American mink, perhaps other smallish mustelids, cats, timber rattlesnakes, and hawks. Red-tailed hawks can take groundhogs at least of up to the size of yearling juveniles, and northern goshawks can take them up to perhaps weak emergent-adult groundhogs in the Spring.

Beyond their large size, groundhogs have several successful anti-predator behaviors, usually retreating to the safety of their burrow which most predators will not attempt to enter, but also being ready to fight off with their sharp claws and large incisors any who press the attack. They can also scale trees to escape a threat.

Occasionally, woodchucks may suffer from parasitism and a woodchuck may die from infestation or from bacteria transmitted by vectors. In areas of intensive agriculture and the dairying regions of the state of Wisconsin, particularly in its southern parts, the woodchuck by 1950 had been almost extirpated. Jackson (1961) suggested that exaggerated reports of damage done by the woodchuck led to excessive culling, substantially reducing its numbers in the state.

In some areas woodchucks are important game animals and are killed regularly for sport, food, or fur. In Kentucky, an estimated 267,500 M. monax were taken annually from 1964 to 1971. Woodchucks had protected status in the state of Wisconsin until 2017. Woodchuck numbers appear to have decreased in Illinois.

Behavior

The time spent observing groundhogs by field biologists represents only a small fraction of time devoted to the field research. W.J. Schoonmaker reports that groundhogs may hide when they see, smell, or hear an observer. Marmot researcher Ken Armitage states that the social biology of the groundhog is poorly studied.
Despite their heavy-bodied appearance, groundhogs are accomplished swimmers and occasionally climb trees when escaping predators or when they want to survey their surroundings. They prefer to retreat to their burrows when threatened; if the burrow is invaded, the groundhog tenaciously defends itself with its two large incisors and front claws. Groundhogs are generally agonistic and territorial among their own species and may skirmish to establish dominance.
Outside their burrow, individuals are alert when not actively feeding. It is common to see one or more nearly motionless individuals standing erect on their hind feet watching for danger. When alarmed, they use a high-pitched whistle to warn the rest of the colony, hence the name "whistle-pig". Groundhogs may squeal when fighting, seriously injured, or caught by a predator. Other sounds groundhogs may make include low barks and a sound produced by grinding their teeth. David P. Barash wrote that he witnessed only two occasions of upright play-fighting among woodchucks and that the upright posture of play-fighting involves sustained physical contact between individuals and may require a degree of social tolerance virtually unknown in M. monax. He said it was possible to conclude, alternatively, that upright play-fighting is part of the woodchuck's behavioral repertory but rarely shown because of physical spacing and/or low social tolerance.

Diet
Mostly herbivorous, groundhogs eat primarily wild grasses and other vegetation, including berries and agricultural crops, when available. In early spring, dandelion and coltsfoot are important groundhog food items. Some additional foods include sheep sorrel, timothy-grass, buttercup, tearthumb, agrimony, red and black raspberries, mulberries, buckwheat, plantain, wild lettuce, all varieties of clover, and alfalfa. Groundhogs also occasionally eat small animals, such as grubs, grasshoppers, snails, and even baby birds, but are not as omnivorous as many other Sciuridae.

An adult groundhog can eat more than a pound of vegetation daily. In early June, woodchucks' metabolism slows, and while their food intake decreases, their weight increases by as much as 100% as they produce fat deposits to sustain them during hibernation and late winter. Instead of storing food, groundhogs stuff themselves to survive the winter without eating. Thought not to drink water, groundhogs are reported to obtain needed liquids from the juices of food-plants, aided by their sprinkling with rain or dew.

Burrows
Groundhogs are excellent burrowers, using burrows for sleeping, rearing young, and hibernating. The longest burrow measured  plus two short side galleries. Though groundhogs are the most solitary of the marmots, several individuals may occupy the same burrow. Groundhog burrows usually have two to five entrances, providing groundhogs their primary means of escape from predators. Burrows can pose a serious threat to agricultural and residential development by damaging farm machinery and even undermining building foundations. In a June 7, 2009, Humane Society of the United States article, "How to Humanely Chuck a Woodchuck Out of Your Yard", John Griffin, director of Humane Wildlife Services, stated you would have to have a lot of woodchucks working over a lot of years to create tunnel systems that would pose any risk to a structure. 

The burrow is used for safety, retreat in bad weather, hibernating, sleeping, love nest, and nursery.
In addition to the nest, there is an excrement chamber. The hibernation or nest chamber is lined with dead leaves and dried grasses. The nest chamber may be about twenty inches to three feet below ground surface. There are typically two burrow openings or holes. One is the main entrance, the other a spy hole. Description of the length of the burrow often includes side galleries. W. H. Fisher investigated nine burrows, finding the deepest point  down. Numbers of burrows per individual groundhog decrease with urbanization.

Bachman mentioned that when the young groundhogs are a few months old, they prepare for separation, digging a number of holes in the area of their early home. Some of these holes were only a few feet deep and never occupied but the numerous burrows gave the impression that groundhogs live in communities.

Hibernation

Groundhogs are one of the few species that enter into true hibernation, and often build a separate "winter burrow" for this purpose. This burrow is usually in a wooded or brushy area and is dug below the frost line and remains at a stable temperature well above freezing during the winter months. In most areas, groundhogs hibernate from October to March or April, but in more temperate areas, they may hibernate as little as three months. Groundhogs hibernate longer in northern latitudes than southern latitudes. To survive the winter, they are at their maximum weight shortly before entering hibernation. During hibernation, they experience periods of torpor and arousal. Hibernating woodchucks lose as much as half their body weight by February. They emerge from hibernation with some remaining body fat to live on until the warmer spring weather produces abundant plant materials for food. Males emerge from hibernation before females. Groundhogs are mostly diurnal, and are often active early in the morning or late afternoon.

Reproduction

Usually groundhogs breed in their second year, but a small proportion may breed in their first. The breeding season extends from early March to mid- or late April, after hibernation. Woodchucks are polygynous  but only alpine and woodchuck marmot females have been shown to mate with multiple males. A mated pair remains in the same den throughout the 31- to 32-day gestation period. As birth of the young approaches in April or May, the male leaves the den. One litter is produced annually. Female woodchucks give birth to one to nine offspring, with most litters ranging between 3 and 5 pups. Groundhog mothers introduce their young to the wild once their fur is grown in and they can see. At this time, if at all, the father groundhog comes back to the family. By the end of August, the family breaks up; or at least, the larger number scatter, to burrow on their own.

Relationship with humans
Both their diet and their habit of burrowing make groundhogs serious nuisance animals around farms and gardens. They will eat many commonly grown vegetables, and their burrows can undermine foundations.

Very often, the dens of groundhogs provide homes for other animals, including skunks, red foxes, and cottontail rabbits. Foxes and skunks feed upon field mice, grasshoppers, beetles, and other creatures that destroy farm crops. In aiding these animals, the groundhog indirectly helps the farmer. In addition to providing homes for itself and other animals, the groundhog aids in soil improvement by bringing subsoil to the surface. The groundhog is also a valuable game animal and is considered a difficult sport when hunted in a fair manner. In some parts of the U.S., they have been eaten.

A report in 1883 by the New Hampshire Legislative Woodchuck Committee describes the groundhog's objectionable character:

The committee concludes that "a small bounty will prove of incalculable good; at all events, even as an experiment, it is certainly worth trying; therefore your committee would respectfully recommend that the accompanying bill be passed."

Groundhogs may be raised in captivity, but their aggressive nature can pose problems. Doug Schwartz, a zookeeper and groundhog trainer at the Staten Island Zoo, has been quoted as saying "They're known for their aggression, so you're starting from a hard place. His natural impulse is to kill 'em all and let God sort 'em out. You have to work to produce the sweet and cuddly." Groundhogs cared for in wildlife rehabilitation that survive but cannot be returned to the wild may remain with their caregivers and become educational ambassadors.

In the United States and Canada, the yearly February 2 Groundhog Day celebration has given the groundhog recognition and popularity. The most popularly known of these groundhogs are Punxsutawney Phil, Wiarton Willie, Jimmy the Groundhog, Dunkirk Dave, and Staten Island Chuck kept as part of Groundhog Day festivities in Punxsutawney, Pennsylvania; Wiarton, Ontario; Sun Prairie, Wisconsin; Dunkirk, New York; and Staten Island respectively. The 1993 comedy film Groundhog Day references several events related to Groundhog Day, and portrays both Punxsutawney Phil himself, and the annual Groundhog Day ceremony. Famous Southern groundhogs include General Beauregard Lee, based at Dauset Trails Nature Center outside Atlanta, Georgia.

Groundhogs are used in medical research on hepatitis B-induced liver cancer. A percentage of the woodchuck population is infected with the woodchuck hepatitis virus (WHV), similar to human hepatitis B virus. Humans do not receive hepatitis from woodchucks with WHV, but the virus and its effects on the liver make the woodchuck the best available animal for the study of viral hepatitis in humans. The only other animal model for hepatitis B virus studies is the chimpanzee, an endangered species. Woodchucks are also used in biomedical research investigating metabolic function, obesity, energy balance, the endocrine system, reproduction, neurology, cardiovascular disease, cerebrovascular disease, and neoplastic disease. Researching the hibernation patterns of groundhogs may lead to benefits for humans, including lowering of the heart rate in complicated surgical procedures.

Groundhog burrows have revealed at least two archaeological sites, the Ufferman Site in the U.S. state of Ohio and Meadowcroft Rockshelter in Pennsylvania. Archaeologists have never excavated the Ufferman Site, but the activities of local groundhogs have revealed numerous artifacts. They favor the loose soil of the esker at the site lies, and their burrow digging has brought many objects to the surface: human and animal bones, pottery, and bits of stone. Woodchuck remains were found in the Indian mounds at Aztalan, Jefferson County, Wisconsin.

Robert Frost's poem "A Drumlin Woodchuck" uses the imagery of a groundhog dug into a small ridge as a metaphor for his emotional reticence.

References

Further reading

External links 

 Woodchuck, Hinterland Who's Who
 Woodchuck (Groundhog), Missouri Conservation Commission
 NIH Guide: BREEDING AND EXPERIMENTAL FACILITY FOR WOODCHUCKS (MARMOTA MONAX) Breeding and Experimental Facility for Woodchucks

 
Marmots
Mammals of Canada
Mammals of the United States
Fauna of the Eastern United States
Fauna of the Northeastern United States
Articles containing video clips
Mammals described in 1758
Taxa named by Carl Linnaeus